is a Japanese footballer.

Career statistics

Club

Notes

References

1992 births
Living people
Yamanashi Gakuin University alumni
Japanese footballers
Japanese expatriate footballers
Association football midfielders
Albirex Niigata Singapore FC players
MIO Biwako Shiga players
Artista Asama players
Singapore Premier League players
Japan Football League players
Japanese expatriate sportspeople in Singapore
Expatriate footballers in Singapore